George Albert Llano (22 November 1911 – 9 February 2003), born  Jorge Alberto Cecilio Perez y Llano,  was a Cuban-born American polar explorer and botanist who specialized in the field of lichenology. He was an expert in the Umbilicariaceae.

Early life
Llano was born in Havana, Cuba in either 1910, according to baptismal records, or 1911, based on legal records. He immigrated to the United States in 1918. He obtained his undergraduate degree at Cornell University in 1935, and his master's degree at Teachers College, Columbia University in 1939. In 1949, he completed his Ph.D. in botany at Washington University in St. Louis under Carroll William Dodge.

Career
Llano took various jobs across the country before settling at the National Academy of Sciences and working on the International Geophysical Year. His experience in Antarctica led him to work for the National Science Foundation Office of Polar Programs in 1961. In 1972, he was promoted to Chief Scientist. His work in the Antarctic Biology and Medicine division was instrumental in establishing permanent Antarctic stations. He retired in 1977.

After his retirement, Llano continued lecturing, guiding expeditions, and fundraising for researchers. Among his beneficiaries were Ivan Mackenzie Lamb and Henry Andrew Imshaug, who undertook notable lichenological expeditions.

Llano died on 9 February 2003 of influenza while cruising on the Akademik Ioffe.

Legacy
The whale genus Llanocetus is named for Llano. Mount Llano was also named in his honor. Carroll Dodge named some lichen species after him, including Buellia llanoi , Lecania llanoi , Physcia llanoi , and Thelidium llanoi . His monograph on the Umbilicariaceae is considered a seminal work in the field of lichenology.

References

People from Havana
Cuban botanists
American lichenologists
Cornell University alumni
1911 births
2003 deaths
Cuban expatriates in the United States
Teachers College, Columbia University alumni
Washington University in St. Louis alumni